Konadu is a surname. Notable people with the surname include:

Alex Konadu (born 1950s), Ghanaian guitarist
Asare Konadu (1932–1994), Ghanaian journalist, novelist and publisher
Maa Afia Konadu (1950–2019), Ghanaian media personality
Maxwell Konadu (born 1972), Ghanaian footballer and manager
Nana Konadu (born 1964 as Nana Yaw Konadu Yeboah), Ghanaian boxer of the 1980s, '90s and 2000s 
Nana Konadu Agyeman (born 1948), the First Lady of Ghana
Yaw Konadu (born 1926), Ghanaian politician

Surnames of Akan origin